Phalaenopsis sanderiana is an orchid in the genus Phalaenopsis that is native to the Philippines. It was named in honour of M. Fredrick Sander. It is a pendant growing epiphyte with epileptic, rounded tip pendulous leaves. Inflorescence are showy of 15 to 20 on 32 inch long raceme.

Varieties
Phalaenopsis sanderiana var. marmorata Rchb.f. Gard. Chron. n.s. 20:812. 1883.
Phalaenopsis sanderiana subvar. alba Veitch Man. Orchid. Pl. 7:35. 1891
Phalaenopsis sanderiana f. alba (Veitch) Christenson. Phalaenopsis: a monograph: 207. 2001

Gallery

References

External links
 
 
 phals.net

sanderiana
Orchids of the Philippines